Harold "Hal" Missingham AO (8 December 19069 April 1994) was an Australian artist, Director of the Art Gallery of New South Wales from 1945 to 1971, and president of the Australian Watercolour Institute from 1952 to 1955.

Early life
Born in Claremont, Western Australia, Missingham was educated at Perth Boys' School, and later undertook an apprenticeship to the process engraver J. Gibney and Son in 1922. He studied drawing at Perth Technical School, attended art schools in both Paris (1926) and London (1926–1932).

From 1927 to 1928 Missingham worked in Canada as a freelance artist and teacher. Before World War II he studied in Perth, Paris and London, where he became friendly with a number of leading artists and developed an interest in photography. He returned to Sydney in 1941 and after serving as a Signalman in the Second Australian Imperial Force helped to found the Studio of Realist Art.

Art Gallery of New South Wales

In 1945 he was appointed Director of the Art Gallery of New South Wales, a post he retained until 1971. The previous incumbent was Will Ashton, who resigned in 1943, Ashton and John Young serving as acting directors until Missingham's appointment.
He oversaw the expansion of the gallery including the construction of the Captain Cook Wing from 1968 to 1970. His collection policy made an outstanding contribution to Australian contemporary art and he was responsible for bringing a number of influential international exhibitions to the country. His memoirs, They Kill You in the End, were published in 1971
Missingham was the longest serving director of the gallery until Edmund Capon.

Honours and awards
Missingham was appointed an Officer of the Order of Australia on 26 January 1978 for service to arts, particularly as Director of the Art Gallery of New South Wales.

Retirement
He retired to Darlington, in the hills east of Perth, where his personal collection of paintings and photographs  was destroyed by fire in 1986.  He died in 1994.

He was survived by his wife Esther (née Long) 1911-2013 to whom he was married for over 50 years.
Esther died on 16 October 2013 aged 102.

Selected works

Notes and References

1906 births
1994 deaths
Australian curators
Photographers from Western Australia
Officers of the Order of Australia
Artists from Perth, Western Australia
Articles containing video clips
20th-century Australian painters
Directors and Presidents of the Art Gallery of New South Wales